Dominique Tanja Slongo (born 13 October 1988 in Bern, Switzerland) is a Swiss ice hockey goaltender.

International career
Slongo was selected for the Switzerland national women's ice hockey team in the 2010 Winter Olympics. She played in part of one game, the final eight minutes of a loss to Canada. She stopped 7 shots, and did not allow a goal.

Slongo also appeared for Switzerland at three IIHF Women's World Championships. Her first appearance came in 2007 IIHF Women's World Championship, where she allowed one goals in nine minutes of playing time. She played in two games at the 2009 IIHF Women's World Championship, winning them both. She also played once at the 2013 IIHF Women's World Championship. She was on the roster for the 2008, 2011 and 2012 championships without playing any games, winning a bronze medal as the #3 goalie in 2012.

Career statistics

International career

References

External links
Eurohockey.com Profile

1988 births
Living people
Ice hockey players at the 2010 Winter Olympics
Olympic ice hockey players of Switzerland
Ice hockey people from Bern
Swiss women's ice hockey goaltenders